Rastodon is an extinct genus of anomodonts. It is the oldest and most basal known genus of bidentalian dicynodonts. Uniquely among dicynodonts, its tusks curve forward. The type and only species is R. procurvidens.

Etymology 
Rastodon is derived from the Rio do Rasto Formation, where its remains were found, and the Greek word for "tooth". The species name, R. procurvidens, means "curved forward tooth" and describes its uniquely shaped teeth.

Provenance 
Only a single specimen of Rastodon has been discovered so far. It comes from the Rio do Rasto Formation, of the Guadalupian of Brazil.

Description 
Rastodon is a fairly typical dicynodont. It bore a beaked head with a single pair of tusks and a keratin-covered nasal boss. However, it does possess several distinctive traits, of which its anteriorly-curved tusks are the most distinctive. Furthermore, its skull is relatively long and shallow compared to its close relatives. Its tusks contacted the lower jaw during propalinal mastication.

Classification 
Rastodon is most parsimoniously placed as the basalmost bidental dicynodont, although it may be slightly more derived within Bidentalia.

See also 

 List of synapsids

References 

Anomodont genera
Dicynodonts
Prehistoric synapsids of South America
Permian animals of South America
Permian Brazil
Fossils of Brazil
Paraná Basin
Fossil taxa described in 2016